Federico Del Grosso (born 24 March 1983) is an Italian football coach and a former player who played as a defender.

Career
The twin brother of Cristiano, the Del Grosso twins started their career at their hometown club Giulianova in Serie C1. They played over 100 league matches before left the club in 2006. In 2006, Cristiano was signed by Serie A club Cagliari Calcio, while Federico was signed by Ternana which had only just been relegated from Serie B.

On 1 February 2010, Cristiano was sold to Internazionale in co-ownership deal, for €180,000. On the same day he was loaned back to Lega Pro Prima Divisione for Pro Patria.

In June 2010 Ternana bought back Luis Antonio Jiménez and gave up Del Grosso, made a net cash of €2.977 million was transferred to Internazionale in total in 2009–10 season. Del Grosso was trained alone in summer 2010, however he injured his patellar ligament.

In July 2011 he terminated his remaining 3-year contract with Inter, made Inter write-down his accounting value of €264,000.

In August 2016 Del Grosso returned to Giulianova, for amateur club Real Giulianova, a spiritual successor of Giulianova Calcio.

Coaching career
On 19 January 2021, he was fired as the head coach of Giulianova.

References

External links
 Profile at AIC.Football.it 

Italian footballers
Giulianova Calcio players
Ternana Calcio players
Aurora Pro Patria 1919 players
Association football defenders
Italian twins
Sportspeople from the Province of Teramo
1983 births
Living people
Twin sportspeople
Italian football managers
Footballers from Abruzzo
People from Giulianova